Alexander Armstrong Shaw (7 September 1907 – 19 July 1945) was an English cricketer. He was a right-handed batsman and wicket-keeper. He was born in Shardlow and died in New Delhi.

Shaw's first-class debut was playing for Sussex against Cambridge University. In Shaw's first innings in the field, he caught three batsmen and stumped three others.

Shaw's second and final first-class match was eight years later, playing for Bengal. Shaw scored just a single run in the two innings in which he batted.

External links
Alexander Shaw at Cricket Archive 

1907 births
1945 deaths
English cricketers
Sussex cricketers
Bengal cricketers
People from Shardlow
Cricketers from Derbyshire
Indian Army personnel killed in World War II
Wicket-keepers